Governor of Santa Cruz may refer to:
 Governor of Santa Cruz Department, Bolivia.
 Governor of Santa Cruz Province, Argentina.